was a village located in Ōchi District, Shimane Prefecture, Japan.

On October 1, 2004, Daiwa, along with the town of Ōchi (also from Ōchi District), was merged to create the town of Misato.

References 

Dissolved municipalities of Shimane Prefecture